Marsh Gibbon is a village and civil parish in Buckinghamshire, England.

History
The village name comes from the English word 'marsh', describing the typical state of land in the area due to the high water table of the Aylesbury Vale.  The affix 'Gibbon' derives from the family name 'Gibwen', the lords of the manor here in the twelfth century.  In manorial rolls of 1292 the village was recorded as Mersh Gibwyne, though earlier (in 1086) it was known simply as Merse.

One of the two entries in the Domesday Book for the village is unique in having the only comment of any kind, namely "Graviter et miserabiliter". In translation the complete entry reads:

Ailric's manor, now named Westbury Manor, was given by King Edward IV to the Company of Cooks in London, though it has since been sold into private hands.

The second manor was the property of the abbey of Grestein in Normandy, France. However, in 1365 this was seized by the Crown because it belonged to a foreign church.  In 1437 it was granted to an almshouse trust founded at Ewelme in Oxfordshire. In 1617 James I granted the Mastership of the Ewelme Trust to the Regius Professor of Medicine at the University of Oxford in whose hands it remains today. Its manor house is Elizabethan and situated just south of the thirteenth-century church and about 200 metres from Westbury Manor to the West.

Following a skirmish at Hillesden in 1645, the parliamentarian troops were garrisoned here in Marsh Gibbon before marching on to Boarstall. The ground works of their encampment were visible in the field to northwest of the Ewelme manor house but have since been flattened in the late 1950s.

Geography
To the east of the village is the hamlet of Little Marsh and to the south east is the hamlet of Summerstown.

Amenities
The parish church of Marsh Gibbon is dedicated to St Mary the Virgin. Robert Clavering, who later became the Bishop of Peterborough, was the rector from 1719.
The village has two pubs, the Greyhound and the Plough.

North of the village and just outside Poundon, is Tower Hill Business Park. This was previously Poundon Hill Wireless Station, a FCO/MI6 signals intelligence station.

Marsh Gibbon Church of England School is a mixed, voluntary aided primary school, with approximately 100 pupils. It takes children from the age of four through to the age of eleven.

References 

 

Villages in Buckinghamshire
Civil parishes in Buckinghamshire